David Regis (born December 2, 1968) is a retired professional soccer player and coach who played as a defender. He was most recently the assistant coach of US Mondorf-les-Bains. Born in Martinique, an Overseas Department of France, he played for the United States at the 1998 and 2002 World Cups.

Club career 
Regis was born in La Trinité, Martinique, and began his pro career in 1988 with Valenciennes FC and played there until 1993. He was transferred to RC Strasbourg in 1993 where he won the 1995 UEFA Intertoto Cup. He then moved to RC Lens in 1996, and Karlsruhe in 1997. He transferred to FC Metz, leaving after the 2002 FIFA World Cup, spent four years there, and spent a season at Troyes AC. From the 2004–05 season, Regis played at the lower levels of the Belgian Leagues with FC Bleid respectively and retired in the summer of 2008.

International career 
Since Regis's wife was an American citizen, an option to play for the United States appeared. Steve Sampson, the U.S. national coach, jumped at the chance of having an experienced left back on the World Cup squad (though Regis's preferred position was always center back – where he was most successful in his club career), and promised Regis a starting position on the team if he became a U.S. citizen. Regis was naturalized on May 20, 1998 and received his first cap against Kuwait just three days later. Regis received the starting spot from Sampson, in front of long-time starter Jeff Agoos.
Regis played all three matches in the World Cup, and despite being one of the more effective players for the US, the Americans lost all three of their group matches.

Regis made the U.S. roster for the 2002 FIFA World Cup as well, but did not play at the tournament. He retired with 27 caps.

Coaching career 
After his retirement from playing, he worked as head coach in Djibouti with Royal Racing Athlétic Florenvillois and Royale Espérance Rossignol.

In January 2017, he took over as sporting director of the Martinique national team.

References

External links 
 

1968 births
Living people
People from La Trinité, Martinique
American soccer players
United States men's international soccer players
French footballers
Martiniquais footballers
American people of Martiniquais descent
RC Strasbourg Alsace players
RC Lens players
Karlsruher SC players
FC Metz players
ES Troyes AC players
Valenciennes FC players
Ligue 1 players
Bundesliga players
Expatriate footballers in France
Expatriate footballers in Germany
1998 FIFA World Cup players
2002 FIFA World Cup players
French emigrants to the United States
Association football defenders